Pando (Latin for "I spread") is a clonal organism representing an individual male quaking aspen (Populus tremuloides). It was identified as a single living organism because its parts possess identical genetic markers and it is assumed to have a massive interconnected underground root system. Pando occupies  and is estimated to weigh collectively , making it the heaviest known organism. The root system of Pando is estimated to be up to several thousand years old, placing Pando among the oldest known living organisms.

Pando's long-term survival is uncertain due to a combination of factors including drought, human development, grazing, and fire suppression. The Western Aspen Alliance is studying the tree in an effort to save it in collaboration with the United States Forest Service. In areas of Pando lacking adequate protective fencing, grazing animals have prevented Pando from developing enough young stems to fully replace existing older stems as they die. This decline in recruitment of young stems began in the 1980s and has been attributed primarily to mule deer (Odocoileus hemionus), though Pando also undergoes restricted grazing by domestic cattle (Bos taurus) and is potentially browsed by elk (Cervus canadensis).

History
The Pando tree was identified in 1976 by Jerry Kemperman and Burton Barnes. Michael Grant, Jeffrey Mitton, and Yan Linhart of the University of Colorado at Boulder re-examined the clone in 1992, naming it Pando and claiming it to be the world's largest organism by weight. Both teams of researchers described Pando as a single asexual reproduction organism based on its morphological characteristics. Genetic sampling and analysis in 2008 by Jennifer DeWoody, Carol Rowe, Valerie Hipkins, and Karen Mock of Utah State University and the University of Southampton confirmed the earlier analyses and increased the clone's estimated size from 43.3 to 43.6 hectares. Paul Rogers and Darren McAvoy, also with Utah State University, completed the first comprehensive assessment of Pando's status in 2018 and stressed the importance of reducing herbivory by mule deer to conserving Pando for the future. In 2019, Rogers and Jan Šebesta surveyed other vegetation within Pando besides aspen, finding additional support for their 2018 conclusion that interactions between browsing and past and ongoing management have had adverse effects on Pando's long-term resilience to change.

While Pando is the largest known aspen clone and its age has received considerable attention, other large and old clones exist. According to an Organisation for Economic Co-operation and Development (OECD) report in 2000:

In 2006 the United States Postal Service published a stamp in commemoration of the aspen, calling it one of the forty "Wonders of America".

Size and age
The root system is estimated to be several thousand years old with habitat modeling suggesting a maximum age of 14,000 years. Individual aspen stems typically do not live beyond 100–130 years and mature areas within Pando are approaching this limit.

Mitton and Grant summarize the development of stems in aspen clones:

Range of age estimates
Due to the progressive replacement of stems and roots, the overall age of an aspen clone cannot be determined from tree rings. In Pando's case, ages up to 1 million years have therefore been suggested. An age of 80,000 years is often given for Pando, but this claim derives from a National Park Service web page that does not provide a source for its number and is inconsistent with the Forest Service's post ice-age estimate. Glaciers repeatedly formed on the Fish Lake Plateau over the past several hundred thousand years and the Fish Lake valley occupied by Pando was partially filled by ice as recently as the last glacial maximum. Ages greater than approximately 16,000 years therefore require Pando to have survived at least the Pinedale glaciation, something that appears unlikely under current genetic estimates of Pando's age and modeling of variation in Pando's local climate.

Estimates of Pando's age have also been influenced by changes in the understanding of establishment of aspen clones in western North America. Earlier sources argued germination and successful establishment of aspen on new sites was rare in the last 10,000 years and, therefore, Pando's root system was likely over 10,000 years old. More recent observations, however, have shown seedling establishment of new aspen clones is a regular occurrence and can be abundant on sites exposed by wildfire. These findings are summarized in the U.S. Forest Service's Fire Effects Information System:

See also
Basal shoot
List of oldest trees
List of individual trees
Rhizome
Vegetative reproduction
 Largest organisms

References

Additional references from OECD quote in history section

External links
 
Pando at Atlas Obscura

Populus
Individual trees in Utah
Fishlake National Forest
Oldest trees